Nepalgunj Airport  is a domestic airport serving Nepalgunj in Nepal. There are plans by the Civil Aviation Authority of Nepal to promote the airport to an international airport and establishing immigration, customs and quarantine facilities.

History
The airport has been in service since 1961. In land area it is the third largest airport in Nepal, after Dhangadhi Airport. It also has the second greatest number of aircraft and passenger movements. After the introduction of FK-100 jet aircraft, passenger movement at this airport increased by 13.39% in 2005 (up to November) against the figure in the year 2004.

In 2005, Flying Dragon Airlines set up its operating base at the airport, however the airline ceased to operate one year later.

Future developments
Since 2018, the airport is being upgraded to serve as an international airport, as Buddha Air is preparing to start direct flights to Delhi. There are plans to construct a new international terminal with separate customs facilities as well as extending the runway.

Facilities

Airlines and destinations

Statistics

Passenger numbers

References

External links
 Official site
 

Airports in Nepal
Buildings and structures in Banke District